Antwan Russell (born 6 November 1986) is a Bermudian professional footballer who plays as a forward for Paget Lions.

Club career
Russell began his career with PHC Zebras, before moving to Dandy Town Hornets he also had stints with Robin Hood and Somerset Eagles in the Bermudian Premier Division before joining the Bermuda Hogges in the USL Second Division in 2009. He also moved to Southampton Rangers in the local league in 2009.

Russell was involved in a serious controversy in August 2012 when boy hood club PHC Zebras attempted to block his transfer to newly promoted club Robin Hood FC. In April 2013, he moved to English Northern Premier League Premier Division side Ilkeston.

International career
Russell made his debut for Bermuda in an October 2011 World Cup qualification match against Trinidad and Tobago and has, as of November 2015, earned a total of eight caps, scoring five goals. He has represented his country in three FIFA World Cup qualification matches.

Personal life
Antwan's brother Tokia Russell also played for Bermuda.

Career statistics

Club

International
Scores and results list Bermuda's goal tally first, score column indicates score after each Russell goal.

References

External links
 

1986 births
Living people
People from Hamilton Parish
Association football forwards
Bermudian footballers
Bermuda international footballers
PHC Zebras players
Dandy Town Hornets F.C. players
Bermuda Hogges F.C. players
Ilkeston F.C. players
Robin Hood F.C. players
USL Second Division players
USL League Two players
Bermudian expatriate footballers
Expatriate footballers in England